Père David's snowfinch (Pyrgilauda davidiana), also known as the small snowfinch, is a species of bird in the sparrow family.

It is found in Mongolia, southern Siberia and northern China. Its natural habitat is temperate grassland.

References

External links
 
 
 Image at the Animal Diversity Web

Père David's snowfinch
Birds of Mongolia
Birds of North China
Père David's snowfinch
Taxonomy articles created by Polbot